45P/Honda–Mrkos–Pajdušáková is a short-period comet discovered by Minoru Honda December 3, 1948. It is named after Minoru Honda, Antonín Mrkos, and Ľudmila Pajdušáková. The object revolves around the Sun on an elliptical orbit with a period of 5.25 years. The nucleus is 1.3 kilometers in diameter. On August 19 and 20, 2011, it became the fifteenth comet detected by ground radar telescope.

During the 1995 perihelion passage, the comet was visible to Solar and Heliospheric Observatory (SOHO) on January 16, 1996, when the comet was around apparent magnitude 7 and 4.3° from the Sun.

It is green because it emits diatomic carbon which glows green in the near vacuum of space.

2011 passage 
During the 2011 perihelion passage, the comet was recovered on 5 June at magnitude 21. On 8 July, the comet had a magnitude of approximately 18, and, as of 22 July, nuclear condensation was noticed around magnitude 16. It was expected to reach a peak magnitude of around 7.3 in late September near perihelion.

On August 15, 2011, the comet made a close approach of only  from the Earth and it was studied by the Goldstone Deep Space Network. Radar observations on August 19 and 20 detected echoes from the nucleus and coma.

2017 passage 
45P/Honda–Mrkos–Pajdušáková came to perihelion on December 31, 2016. By February 4, 2017, it was around magnitude 7 and the coma was about 100,000 km across. The comet required binoculars to be seen because of the low surface brightness. The comet passed  from Earth on February 11, 2017, which was the same day as a lunar eclipse.

The next notable close approach will be in October 2032 when the comet might brighten to magnitude 7.

August Delta Capricornids 
On 16 August 2022 the global CAMS and Sonotaco network detected a modest outburst of meteors with an orbit that resembled comet 45P. The shower received the temporary designation of M2022-Q1, and was later permanently named the August Delta Capricornids. The meteors had an entry speed of 24.4 km/s and originated from the border of Aquarius and Capricornus with R.A. 21:40 and a declination of –11.9°. This was the first time an encounter with a dust trail of 45P has been confirmed and it came from the 1980 meteoroid stream of 45P. In all, 137 meteors were triangulated by the global CAMS networks.

References

External links

Arecibo Observatory captures revealing images of Comet 45P/Honda-Mrkos-Pajdusakova
Comet 45P/Honda-Mrkos-Pajdusakova Sky Charts and Coordinates
Comet 45P/Honda–Mrkos–Pajdušáková: Visibility - NASA
Orbital simulation from JPL (Java) / Horizons Ephemeris
Elements and Ephemeris for 45P/Honda-Mrkos-Pajdusakova – Minor Planet Center
45P/Honda-Mrkos-Pajdusakova / 2011 – Seiichi Yoshida @ aerith.net
45P/Honda-Mrkos-Pajdušáková @ Royal Astronomical Society of New Zealand
45P/Honda-Mrkos-Pajdusakova 2001 passage at Astrosite Groningen (magnitude and coma estimates)
45P/H-M-P as seen by STEREO HI2A Comet Al (September 29, 2011)
45P as seen by STEREO-A HI-2
45P as seen on 2011-Jul-27 by Ernesto Guido, Giovanni Sostero & Nick Howes (GRAS 0.51m f/6.9 reflector)
Michael Jäger color photo of 45P/Honda on 2011-09-29
45P as seen by SOHO on 1996/01/16 00:58 (visible halfway between the Sun and the top of the frame)
45P as seen by SOHO/SWAN on 2017-Feb-06 (visible upper left)
Fritz Helmut Hemmerich, 2017-Jan-02 Astronomy Picture of the Day: Comet 45P Returns

Periodic comets
0045
045P
Comets in 2011
Comets in 2016
19481203